Soft sculpture is a type of sculpture made using cloth, foam rubber, plastic, paper, fibres and similar material that are supple and nonrigid.

They can also be made out of natural materials if combined to make a nonrigid object.

Soft sculpture is an old German technique very popular in Japan with artists like Yayoi Kusama boosting the heritages of this new and innovative medium for interior designers.

The technique was popularised in the 1960s by artists such as Claes Oldenburg and Yayoi Kusama. Claes Oldenburg and other members of the Art Pop Movement are accredited with the creation of soft sculpture. During this time period members of the Art Pop Movement created art with themes of the times such as pop culture, consumerism, and mass production. Oldenburg specifically would take average everyday items and make them larger than life; one of his most notable works of this time is the Floor Burger. The Floor Burger is primarily made out of canvas filled with rubber foam and cardboard. It contains a large hamburger patty nestled in the middle of two tan buns with a pickle for garnish on the top. Yayoi Kusama also is responsible for the rise of soft sculpture in the 1960s, although she believes that Claes Oldenburg copied some of her pieces. One of her most popular soft sculpture works is entitled Accumulation No. 1. Kusama hand sewed and painted projections she called "phalluses," and placed them on an armchair. After this works first exhibition, people were surprised that Kusama had sexualized an everyday object.

Soft sculpture was also a key feature during the 1970s in Post-Minimalist art. Artists during this time would create sculptures using materials that they had around them. A key artist during this time was Eva Hesse. One of Eva's most popular works does not have a title. It is composed of latex, string, rope and wire suspended from the ceiling.

The following is a list of selected artists who have worked with soft sculpture:
Magdalena Abakanowicz
Lynda Benglis 
Joseph Beuys
Louise Bourgeois
Isabelle de Borchgrave
Serena ChaCha
Jann Haworth
Eva Hesse
Mark Jenkins
Joel Jones
Dylan Jones
Polly Alice McCann
Annette Messager
Robert Morris
Senga Nengudi
Susan Mohl Powers
Xavier Roberts
Faith Ringgold
Richard Serra
Marjorie Strider
Lucy Sparrow
Do-ho Suh
Martha Nelson Thomas
Megan Whitmarsh

References

External links
 http://www.nga.gov.au/EXHIBITION/softsculpture/
Blick Art Materials Lesson Plan about soft sculpture
An Exhibition (SoftSculpture) at the National Gallery of Australia - 24 April – 12 July 2009
5 sculpture artists using textile techniques

Sculpture
Crafts